Cotula is a genus of flowering plant in the sunflower family. It includes plants known generally as water buttons or buttonweeds.

The species within this genus can vary extensively in their habit, leaf division, involucre, receptacle and achenes. This makes it difficult to define them by comparing their morphology. The genus can only be defined by looking at the corollas of their flowers. Most are disciform (lacking ray florets). These corollas may be tubular, reduced or even absent. Another characteristic is their solitary heads growing on a peduncle.

Taxonomy
Cotula is the largest genus found in the Southern Hemisphere of the tribe Anthemideae. This genus was first mentioned by Carl Linnaeus, who described four species in his first edition (1753) of Species Plantarum. In 1867 the genus was subdivided by George Bentham into three sections. Since his account, only a few changes have been made but the number of species has remained more or less stable. The sections possess different basic chromosome numbers : 
 section Cotula : largest section with about 40 species; mostly in South Africa, a few in North Africa and Australia  + the cosmopolitan species C. coronopifolia and the widespread species C. turbinata; this section also includes the former genera Cenia and Otochlamys; basic chromosome numbers x = 8 and x = 10.
 section Strongylosperma (Less.) Benth.: a total of eight species, found in warmer parts of Africa and Asia (often lumped as C. anthemoides), Central and South America (C. mexicana) and Australia (five species, including C. australis); basic chromosome number : x = 18
 section Leptinella (Cass.) Hook f. : the remaining thirty species, found in South America and the Falkland Islands (the type species C. scariosa), New Zealand, the Subantarctic Islands (together 24) and five species from Australia and New Zealand.;  the species in this section have a distinctive characteristic not found in the other sections : inflated pistillate corollas; basic chromosome number : x = 13. See also Leptinella.

David G. Lloyd has proposed that the five species from Australia and New Guinea are distinctive enough from the other species from the section Leptinella to be brought under a new section with the proposed name Oligoleima (type species C. longipes).

 Species

Uses
Cotula is used in New Zealand as ground cover for bowling greens, playing fields on which the ball-game of bowls is played

Footnotes

References

Further reading
 Jakubowsky, G. and L. Mucina. (2007). Phylogeny of the South African centred plant genus Cotula (Asteraceae). South African Journal of Botany 73:2 292.

External links
 
 

 
Asteraceae genera
Taxonomy articles created by Polbot
Taxa named by Carl Linnaeus